Treaty or Peace of Lübeck ended the Danish intervention in the Thirty Years' War (Low Saxon or Emperor's War, Kejserkrigen). It was signed in Lübeck on 22 May 1629 by Albrecht von Wallenstein and Christian IV of Denmark, and on 7 June by Ferdinand II, Holy Roman Emperor. The Catholic League was formally included as a party. It restored to Denmark–Norway its pre-war territory at the cost of final disengagement from imperial affairs.

Background

The treaty of Lübeck ended a stage of the Thirty Years' War referred to as the Lower Saxon or Emperor's War, which had begun in 1625. Initial success was with the Danish armies, commanded by Christian IV of Denmark and Ernst von Mansfeld. Then, in 1626, their opponents, a Catholic League army commanded by Johann Tserclaes, Count of Tilly, and an army of Ferdinand II, Holy Roman Emperor, commanded by Albrecht von Wallenstein, turned the tide in the battles of Dessau Bridge and Lutter am Barenberge. Mansfeld moved his army toward Silesia and Hungary, but that campaign failed in 1627, and Mansfeld deserted and later died of plague. 

Wallenstein and Tilly subsequently gained central and northern Germany, joined their forces during the summer of 1627, invaded Danish Holstein in September, and advanced through the Jutland peninsula as far as Limfjord. While Christian IV's control of the western Baltic Sea and the Danish isles was unchallenged, Wallenstein was given the Duchy of Mecklenburg vis-a-vis Denmark in January 1628, and was preparing to construct a navy of his own at the occupied ports of Ålborg, Wismar, Rostock and Greifswald starting in late 1627.

Christian responded with an amphibious campaign in 1628, using his fleet to make landfalls along the occupied coastlines, and destroying the naval facilities in Ålborg, Wismar, and Greifswald. Wallenstein, who had nevertheless managed to build thirteen vessels in Wismar under Philipp von Mansfeld, was unable to use them, because Swedish ships were blockading that port. Christian IV concluded an alliance with Gustavus Adolphus of Sweden in April, and both supported Stralsund in her successful resistance against Wallenstein. In August, an attempt to secure another bridgehead on the southern Baltic shore failed with Christian IV's defeat in the Battle of Wolgast. After this battle, the final one in the Kejserkrigen, Christian IV was ready to negotiate—and so was Wallenstein, whom the Scandinavian alliance seriously threatened.

Negotiations

In September 1627, Tilly and Wallenstein had drafted a peace proposal for the Catholic League and the Holy Roman Emperor. The proposal had Christian IV of Denmark:
surrender all imperial offices,
surrender his bishoprics in the Lower Saxon Circle,
buy out his provinces of Holstein, Schleswig and Jutland from the imperial occupation forces for two million Reichstaler each,
cede either Glückstadt or Holstein to Ferdinand II, Holy Roman Emperor.
While the Danish rigsraadet accepted the proposal as a basis for negotiations, this was rejected by Christian IV. While the Catholic League pressed the emperor to continue the war, and Christian IV was urged likewise by England and the Netherlands, both sent their emissaries to Lübeck for negotiations in January 1629. The emperor had Wallenstein negotiate for him, and Christian IV had sent entrusted delegates whom he had selected bypassing his rigsraadet. Initially, both sides proposed diametrical peace terms:

Christian IV's position was somewhat strengthened by his military successes in 1628, but more so by Wallenstein's fear of a Danish-Swedish alliance. Bagging that fear, Christian IV personally met with Gustavus Adolphus of Sweden in February 1629, at Ulvsbäck. Gustavus Adolphus proposed a joint invasion of the empire, either from Stralsund or from Glückstadt, yet under the premise that overall command was with him, and that the invasion force would consist of more Swedish than Danish forces. Christian IV refused.

Both Christian IV and Wallenstein were aware that neither of them would be able to get all their demands through, thus they resorted to secret negotiations in Güstrow, Mecklenburg.

Treaty

The treaty was concluded by Albrecht von Wallenstein and Christian IV of Denmark on 22 May 1629, and ratified by Ferdinand II, Holy Roman Emperor on 7 June. The Catholic League was formally added as a party. The treaty restored to Christian IV his pre-war possessions, and obliged him to cede his claims to Lower Saxon bishoprics, to discontinue his alliances with the North German states, and to not interfere with further imperial affairs in the future.

Tilly had not succeeded in implementing a compensation of the imperial war costs on Christian IV. Also not included in the treaty's text was that Christian IV stop supporting Frederick V, Elector Palatine, as demanded by Maximilian I, Elector of Bavaria.

Consequences

The treaty marked a turning point in Denmark–Norway's status, subsequently reduced from that of a major European power to a politically insignificant state. The new Nordic power would be Sweden, who was to turn the tide of the Thirty Years' War after her forces landed in Pomerania in 1630, and, starting with the Torstenson War, subsequently deprived Denmark of her trans-Kattegat provinces.

The treaty further divided Christian IV and the Rigsraadet, for Christian IV argued that if the latter had been in charge, it would have accepted the initial imperial territorial and financial demands.

Ferdinand II had hoped for more favourable terms, and was surprised and disappointed of what Wallenstein had negotiated. While he had arranged for imposing his war costs on Christian IV, this was no longer an option.

Deprived of Danish-Norwegian protection, the North German states faced the Edict of Restitution, issued by Ferdinand II already during the negotiations. It aimed at a re-Catholization of northern Germany, and the restitution of former ecclesial possessions that had been secularized during the Protestant Reformation.

See also
History of Denmark
History of Norway
List of treaties

Sources

References

Bibliography

External links

Encarta Encyclopedia: Thirty Years' War
MacroHistory: The Thirty Years' War

Thirty Years' War treaties
History of Lübeck
Treaties of the Holy Roman Empire
1629 in Denmark
1629 in Norway
1629 treaties
Treaties of Denmark–Norway
1629 in the Holy Roman Empire
Denmark–Holy Roman Empire relations
Albrecht von Wallenstein